Branislav Drobnjak (Serbian Cyrillic: Бранислав Дробњак; born 16 March 1961) is a retired Montenegrin footballer.

International career
Božović made his debut for Yugoslavia in a December 1983 European Championship qualification match against Wales. It remained his sole international appearance.

References

1961 births
Living people
People from Bijelo Polje
Association football defenders
Yugoslav footballers
Yugoslavia international footballers
FK Jedinstvo Bijelo Polje players
FK Budućnost Podgorica players
OFK Titograd players
Yugoslav First League players
Yugoslav Second League players
Yugoslav expatriate footballers
Expatriate footballers in Austria
Yugoslav expatriate sportspeople in Austria